Mia Biltoft (born 3 April 1992) is a Danish handball player. She plays for the club SG BBM Bietigheim and on the Danish national team.

References

Danish female handball players
1992 births
Living people